Myrmecia elegans is an Australian ant which belongs to the genus Myrmecia. It is a native species to Australia. The Myrmecia elegans is distributed in the more western states and regions of the country.

The average length for the Myrmecia elegans is 13–14.5 millimetres. The head, gaster, and other features are black, thorax and node (i.e. nodus) are bright red, the mandibles and antennae are yellow. Legs are a reddish yellow colour.

References

Myrmeciinae
Hymenoptera of Australia
Insects described in 1943
Insects of Australia